I, Pencil: My Family Tree as Told to Leonard E. Read, commonly known as I, Pencil, is an essay by Leonard Read and it was first published in the December 1958 issue of The Freeman.

"I, Pencil" is written in the first person from the point of view of a pencil. The pencil details the complexity of its own creation, listing its components (cedar, lacquer, graphite, ferrule, factice, pumice, wax, glue) and the numerous people involved, down to the sweeper in the factory and the lighthouse keeper guiding the shipment into port.

It was reprinted in The Freeman in May 1996 and as a pamphlet entitled "I... Pencil" in May 1998. In the reprint, Milton Friedman wrote the introduction and Donald J. Boudreaux wrote the afterword. Friedman (the 1976 winner of the Nobel Prize in Economics) used the essay in his 1980 PBS television show Free to Choose and the accompanying book of the same name. In the 2008 50th Anniversary Edition, the introduction is written by Lawrence W. Reed and Friedman wrote the afterword.

References

External links
 I, Pencil, first edition version (1964), provided by Mises Institute
 Free to Choose: Power of the Market – The Pencil, PBS television show episode with Milton Friedman

Economics articles
1958 essays
Pencils
Works originally published in The Freeman
Libertarian publications